Samta Sagar is an Indian actress and writer, known for her comedic and supportive roles in Indian dramas. She appeared in the film Pardes (1997). She has also worked in TV shows like Chotti Bahu and Tota Weds Maina.

Filmography
 Pardes (1997) as Sonali
 Banoo Main Teri Dulhann (2007)
 Yeh Mera India (2008)
 Chotti Bahu (2008–10) as Devki
 Sanjog Se Bani Sangini (2010–11) as Sunehri
 Havan (2011–12) as Lajjo
 Tota Weds Maina (2013) as Ramdulari Tiwari
 Satrangi Sasural (2014) as Geeta Vatsal
 Ghulaam (2017) as Shanti
 Har Shaakh Pe Ullu Baithaa Hai (2018) as Imli Devi
 Gudiya Hamari Sabhi Pe Bhari (2019) as Sarla Devi

References

External links
 

Living people
Actresses from Mumbai
20th-century Indian actresses
21st-century Indian actresses
Actresses in Hindi television
Actresses in Hindi cinema
Indian film actresses
Indian television actresses
Indian soap opera actresses
Year of birth missing (living people)